This is a list of rivers in São Tomé and Príncipe. This list is arranged  by drainage basin, with respective tributaries indented under each larger stream's name.

São Tomé

Listed clockwise, starting at the north end of the island.

Rio do Ouro
Rio Sebastião
Rio Melo
Rio Água Grande
Rio Manuel Jorge
Rio Abade
Rio Bomba
Ribeira Afonso
Rio Angobó
Rio Ió Grande
Rio Umbugo 
Rio Miranda Guedes 
Rio Ana de Chaves
Rio Campos
Rio Martim Mendes
Rio Cáué
Rio Gumbela
Rio Portinho
Rio das Pedras
Rio Massacavu 
Rio Quija
Rio Xufexufe
Rio Morango
Rio Edgar
Rio Lembá
Rio Lembá Pequeno
Rio Cabumbê
Rio Cantador
Rio Paga Fogo
Rio Maria Luisa
Rio Contador
Rio Provaz
Água Castelo

Príncipe

Rio Papagaio
Rio Bibi
Rio Banzú

References
 GEOnet Names Server
Ezilon.com maps, 2009
Recursos e Projectos de Energias Renováveis, Associação Lusófona de Energias Renováveis, p. 6

 
Sao Tome and Principe
Rivers